San Miguel Tepezontes is a municipality in the La Paz department of El Salvador. 
It is located in the countryside 25 minutes east of the capital city, San Salvador, and 40 minutes from the International Airport at Comalapa. It overlooks Lake Ilopango, and San Salvador. The municipality has a population of more than 8,000 people, and is a producer of coffee, corn, beans and tropical fruit.

Municipalities of the La Paz Department (El Salvador)